The stump-tailed porcupine (Coendou rufescens) is a species of rodent in the family Erethizontidae. It is found mainly in Colombia, with a few records from Ecuador.

This species was formerly sometimes assigned to Echinoprocta, a genus no longer recognized since genetic studies showed it to nest within Coendou. Its closest relative is the Andean porcupine (Coendou quichua).

References

Mammals described in 1865
Taxa named by John Edward Gray
Coendou
Mammals of Colombia
Taxonomy articles created by Polbot